Niveocatharylla bifasciella is a moth in the family Crambidae. It was described by Snellen in 1893. It is found on Sulawesi.

References

Crambinae
Moths described in 1893
Taxa named by Samuel Constantinus Snellen van Vollenhoven